

Music

 Alternative R&B
 Blog house
 Brostep
 Chillwave
 Cloud rap
 Complextro
 Crabcore
 Distroid
 Electroclash
 Fidget house
 Freak folk
 Future funk
 Future bass
 Future garage
 Future house
 Hardvapour
 Hipster hop
 Hyperpop
 Hypnagogic pop
 Lo-fi hip hop
 Lo-fi house
 Moombahton
 Mumble rap
 Nightcore
 Noisegrind
Pornogrind
 Seapunk
 Shibuya-kei
 Shitgaze
 Skweee
 Slam death metal
 Slowed and reverb
 Synthwave
 Tropical house
 Vaporwave
 Witch house
 Wonky

See also
 List of electronic music genres
Other genres

 Avant-prog
Bardcore
 Bedroom pop
 Bubblegum bass
 Cringe pop
 Cuddlecore
 Dream-beat
 Downtempo Deathcore[ro]
 Dreampunk
 Folktronica
 Gothabilly
 Indietronica
 Kawaii future bass
 Lowercase
 Minimal wave
 Neon pop-punk
 New pop
 New wave of new wave
 New Weird America
 Nightcore
 Outsider music
 Post-progressive
 Proto-prog
 Proto-punk
 Sophisti-pop
 Yacht rock
 Wonky pop
 Zeuhl

Lists of sub-subgenres
 Heavy metal genres
 Industrial music genres
 Punk rock genres
 Trance genres
Lists of sub-sub-subgenres
 Hardcore punk subgenres

References

Bibliography
 

Musical subcultures
Music journalism